Ralph Herbert Inott (July 15, 1884 – October 27, 1945) was an American football and baseball coach. He served as the head football coach at the University of Cincinnati for one season, in 1908, compiling a record of 1–4–1. Inott was also the head baseball coach at Cincinnati from 1908 to 1909.

Inott was born in 1884 in Cincinnati, Ohio. In 1907, he married Isabel Henderson Burns. The couple later resided in New Mexico. He died on October 27, 1945, of a heart attack at his home in Pecos, New Mexico. He was cremated after a funeral on October 30, 1945.

Head coaching record

Football

References

1884 births
1945 deaths
Cincinnati Bearcats baseball coaches
Cincinnati Bearcats football coaches
Cincinnati Bearcats football players
Players of American football from Cincinnati